Trafalgar most often refers to:

 Battle of Trafalgar (1805), fought near Cape Trafalgar, Spain
 Trafalgar Square, a public space and tourist attraction in London, England
It may also refer to:

Music
 Trafalgar (album), by the Bee Gees

Places
 Cape Trafalgar, a headland in Cádiz, Spain
 Trafalgar, the name of the British Shipping Forecast's sea region surrounding Cape Trafalgar  
 Trafalgar, Indiana, a town in the United States
 Trafalgar Township, a former municipality in Ontario, Canada
 Trafalgar Moraine, in Oakville, Ontario, Canada
 Trafalgar, Nova Scotia, Canada, a community within the Municipality of the District of St. Mary's, Guysborough County
 Trafalgar, Victoria, a town in Gippsland, Victoria, Australia
 Trafalgar, Dominica, a village and waterfall in the St. George province of the Commonwealth of Dominica, West Indies
 Trafalgar, KwaZulu-Natal, a seaside village in South Africa
 Trafalgar, Hougang, a subzone of the town of Hougang located in north-eastern Singapore
 Trafalgar (Madrid), a ward of Chamberi district, Madrid, Spain

Companies
 Trafalgar Tours, a British tour company
Trafalgar Group, an American polling company

Schools
 Trafalgar School (disambiguation)

Transportation
 Trafalgar, one of the GWR 3031 Class locomotives

Vessels
 Trafalgar-class submarines of the Royal Navy
  HMS Trafalgar, British Navy ships

Fictional characters
 Trafalgar Law, an ally to the protagonist from the manga One Piece